Austin Krajicek won his maiden ATP Challenger Tour singles title, beating João Souza 7–5, 6–3

Seeds

Draw

Finals

Top half

Bottom half

References
 Main Draw
 Qualifying Draw

Seguros Bolivar Open Medellin - Singles
2014 Singles